Defending champion Roger Federer defeated Marin Čilić in the final, 6–2, 6–7(5–7), 6–3, 3–6, 6–1 to win the men's singles tennis title at the 2018 Australian Open. It was his record-equalling sixth Australian Open title (tied with Roy Emerson and Novak Djokovic), and his record-extending 20th and last major title overall. With the win, Federer became the oldest man to win a major singles title since Ken Rosewall in 1972. This was the 10th time that Federer defended a major title, the last time being at the 2008 US Open. Čilić became the first Croatian to reach an Australian Open singles final.

This was the first time since the 2008 Wimbledon Championships that two unseeded players (Chung Hyeon and Kyle Edmund) reached the semifinals of a men's singles major, and the first time at the Australian Open since 1999. Chung became the first South Korean player to reach a major quarterfinal and semifinal.

Seeds
All seedings per ATP rankings.

Draw

Finals

Top half

Section 1

Section 2

Section 3

Section 4

Bottom half

Section 5

Section 6

Section 7

Section 8

Other entry information

Wildcards

Qualifying

References
General

Draw
 2018 Australian Open – Men's draws and results at the International Tennis Federation

Specific

Men's Singles
Australian Open (tennis) by year – Men's singles
Australian Open – Men's Singles